Paul Dumbrell (born 1 September 1982) is an Australian business executive and retired racing driver.

Racing history

Junior career
Son of former racing driver Garry Dumbrell, Paul Dumbrell started racing in karts in 1996 and by the end of 1997 Dumbrell was looking to further his racing. He was educated at Xavier College in Kew, Melbourne and resides in Melbourne, Australia. He competed in the Australian Sprint Kart National Championships in April 1998. He then attended a driving course at Sandown Raceway where he briefly drove the ex Craig Lowndes Van Diemen RF85. Paul then attended the Jim Russell International School of Racing in England. During the course, Dumbrell drove a Formula Vauxhall. At age 15 he was the youngest in the class and even though he was the fastest graduate from the school, he was ineligible for the final race, for which drivers had to be 16.

On returning to Australia he looked to do a couple of races in Formula Ford but broke his hip when hit by a car while training on his mountain bike. This injury prevented him from racing for 8 weeks and put an end to any chance of running a Formula Ford.  At the end of 1998 he entered his first production car race, the GT Production three-hour at Bathurst in a Subaru WRX, but his race ended with mechanical failure. For the 1999 season he drove a Formula Holden in the Australian Drivers' Championship, and had his first race in the V8 Supercar Championship Series in August 1999 at Symmons Plains, in Tasmania.

After a full year's experience in a Formula Holden, Dumbrell had the chance to test a Formula 3000 car with Mark Webber for Paul Stoddart's Arrows Team, driving 20 laps in the car at Donington Park. When he returned to Australia he took up a permanent driving spot in the Konica V8 Supercar Development Series. 2001 saw Dumbrell consistently at the front, and he won the Series in 2002.

Dumbrell made his first Bathurst 1000 start at 17 years and 74 days, and was the youngest ever driver to drive a V8 Supercar. He raced a Wynns/Falkuner Racing No. 96 Holden VS Commodore with Matthew White, qualifying the car in 33rd position but retiring on lap 15 after he hit the wall at McPhillamy Park.

2002 saw Dumbrell picked up by Castrol Perkins Racing's Team Owner Larry Perkins as his co-driver in the Castrol Perkins Holden VX Commodore at both the Queensland 500 and Bathurst 1000.  At Bathurst that year, Perkins and Dumbrell finished a surprise fifth position overall.

Full-time V8 Supercars career

Castrol Perkins Motorsport
Dumbrell's fifth placing at Bathurst in 2002 helped him secure a 2-year deal with Castrol Perkins Motorsport for 2003 and 2004. In 2005, Dumbrell achieved his best-ever round V8 Supercar Championship Series result at Symmons Plains, Tasmania - the venue of his first ever V8 Supercar start - ending the round in fifth place. 2005 also saw his best ever Championship placing, finishing in 20th, after placing 29th in 2003 and 24th in 2004.

2006 saw Paul driving the number 11 Holden VZ Commodore to 12th place, his best ever V8 Supercar Championship Series placing. He finished 5th at Bathurst and was within reach of a podium finish until slowed by mechanical problems.

Supercheap Auto Racing
For the 2007 season, Dumbrell moved from Jack Daniels Racing to Supercheap Auto Racing, replacing Greg Murphy. He had a poor season due to the unreliability of the cars, and the only highlight was a 6th placing with Paul Weel at the Sandown 500.

HSV Dealer Team

In 2008, Dumbrell joined the HSV Dealer Team to drive the No. 16 Autobarn Holden Commodore, as teammate to 2006 V8 Supercar Champion, Rick Kelly. It was a difficult season for the team and Dumbrell finished 21st in the championship.

Walkinshaw Racing
In 2009 Dumbrell stayed under the Walkinshaw umbrella with the newly formed Walkinshaw Racing, the team which replaced the newly-defunct HSV Dealer Team. He drove an Autobarn-sponsored Holden VE Commodore.

Rod Nash Racing

For the 2010 V8 Supercar season, Dumbrell signed with Rod Nash Racing to drive their No. 55, "The Bottle-O" sponsored, Ford Performance Racing prepared Ford FG Falcon in a deal encompassing 2010, 2011 and 2012 seasons. This marked his first experience of racing a Ford, having competed in Holdens throughout his V8 Supercar career.

Dumbrell recorded his first V8 Supercar Championship podium finish at the 2010 Falken Tasmania Challenge and followed this up with his first Championship race win and first Championship pole position at the next event, the 2010 Norton 360 Sandown Challenge. On 8 August 2011, Dumbrell announced he will retire from full-time driving at the end of the 2011 season.

Endurance co-driver

Triple Eight Race Engineering

Despite his retirement from full-time racing, Dumbrell returned in a limited basis from 2012 onwards as a co-driver for the two-driver endurance races in V8 Supercars, the Sandown 500, Bathurst 1000 and since 2013, the Gold Coast 600. Dumbrell drives alongside seven-time series champion Jamie Whincup for Triple Eight Race Engineering.

Dumbrell and Whincup's partnership was almost immediately successful, winning the 2012 Supercheap Auto Bathurst 1000. In 2013, they won the 2013 Wilson Security Sandown 500. In 2014, Dumbrell and Whincup won the Enduro Cup as the highest scoring driver combination across the three endurance events, which included winning for a second year running at Sandown in the 2014 Wilson Security Sandown 500.

In 2014, Dumbrell entered the Dunlop V8 Supercar Development Series once again, and won the championship for a second time.

Business
For much of his career, Dumbrell has balanced racing and business. He previously owned a Boost Juice franchise as early as 2002, and was a founding partner of a media company. He also progressed up the ranks of the family business, the Automotive Brands Group – owners of brands such as Autobarn and Autopro – eventually becoming chief executive officer in 2009. Dumbrell's increasing business commitments were cited by him as a reason for his full-time V8 Supercar retirement in 2011. Automotive Brands was sold to Metcash in 2012 with Dumbrell remaining in charge of the automotive business at Metcash, and taking a place on their executive team. Coincidentally Metcash also owned The Bottle-O, a previous sponsor of Dumbrell at Rod Nash Racing. In 2015, the business was again sold, to Burson Group, in an AU$275 million deal. Dumbrell once again remained in charge of the division, and at the announcement of the deal, Burson CEO Darryl Abotomey indicated that there was no reason Dumbrell couldn't continue as an endurance co-driver in the V8 Supercars series alongside his business commitments.

Career results

Complete Development Series results

(key) (Races in bold indicate pole position) (Races in italics indicate fastest lap)

Supercars Championship results
(Races in bold indicate pole position) (Races in italics indicate fastest lap)

Complete Bathurst 1000 results

‡ Kelly replaced Reynolds in the No. 16 post-qualifying after an event-ending accident for Rick's original car.

References

External links
 Paul Dumbrell official site
 V8 Supercars Official Profile
 Driver Database stats
 Racing reference profile

1982 births
Living people
Bathurst 1000 winners
Formula Holden drivers
People educated at Xavier College
Racing drivers from Melbourne
Supercars Championship drivers
Garry Rogers Motorsport drivers